HMS Victoria was the lead ship in her class of two battleships of the Royal Navy. On 22 June 1893, she collided with  near Tripoli, Lebanon, during manoeuvres and quickly sank, killing 358 crew members, including the commander of the British Mediterranean Fleet, Vice-Admiral Sir George Tryon. One of the survivors was executive officer John Jellicoe, later commander-in-chief of the British Grand Fleet at the Battle of Jutland.

Design

Victoria was constructed at a time of innovation and rapid development in ship design. Her name was originally to be Renown, but this was changed to Victoria while still under construction to celebrate Queen Victoria's Golden Jubilee, which took place the year the ship was launched. Her arrival was accompanied by considerable publicity. She was the largest, fastest and most powerful ironclad afloat, with the heaviest guns.

She was the first battleship to be propelled by triple-expansion steam engines. They produced  under forced draught, or  under open draught. She was also the first Royal Navy ship to be equipped with a steam turbine which was used to run a dynamo.

A detailed model of the ship was exhibited at the Royal Navy exhibition in 1892, and another in silver was given to Queen Victoria by the officers of the Royal Navy and Royal Marines as a Jubilee gift.

Design limitations

Despite the ship's many impressive features, compromises in the design meant that she proved less than successful in service.

The ship was nicknamed 'the Slipper' (or when with her sister ship , also attached to the Mediterranean squadron, 'the pair of Slippers') because of a tendency for her low foredeck to disappear from view in even slight seas, and especially, as a result of the low forward deck and raised aft superstructure, for the two ships' humorously perceived resemblance to the indoor footwear.

 The forward deck held a single turret with two BL  Mark I guns. The  gun was chosen because similar large guns had been used in foreign ships, and because of difficulties in obtaining the navy's preferred  design. The great weight of the forward turret with its two guns meant that it had to be mounted low so as not to detract from the ship's stability, and that a similar large gun and turret could not be mounted aft. Instead, the after gun was a BL  gun protected by a gun shield.

The original plan was for main armament fore and aft, and the eventual layout, which followed that of the preceding ironclad battleship , was a compromise that meant the ship could only fire her main armament sideways or forward. It was found that if the guns were fired directly forward, the recoil buckled the deck. 

The gun barrels were found to be so heavy that they drooped when installed on their mountings, and could fire only 75 rounds before barrel wear became excessive.

By comparison, the French battleship Amiral Baudin, constructed at a similar time, had  armour along her whole length. However, the British design produced a faster ship with greater range and larger guns.

Captains and fleet commanders
Victoria was first commissioned in March 1890 by Captain J. E. Stokes, who took the ship to the Mediterranean. This crew then swapped ships with the crew of Camperdown, so that Captain J. C. Burnell now took command. The ship was now flagship of the Mediterranean squadron commanded by Vice-Admiral Sir Anthony Hoskins. In 1891, Sir George Tryon succeeded as fleet commander and Captain Maurice Bourke became the new flag captain onboard Victoria.

1892 grounding

On 29 January 1892, Victoria ran aground at Snipe Point near Platea on the Greek coast. Platea had been selected as a convenient friendly port for British ships to use as a base for exercises with torpedoes and mines, and each ship of the Mediterranean Fleet would go there in turn during the winter. Torpedoes would be launched from fast moving ships in real battle conditions, but it was desirable to practice this in relatively shallow waters so that the torpedoes could be recovered afterwards (they were supposed to float once their motors stopped but sometimes sank). The fore end of the ship ended up  higher out of the water than would be normal as momentum drove it up onto the shoal. The ship's bottom was damaged, and three compartments flooded. These failed, but she assisted with laying anchors to hold the rear of the ship steady until further help could arrive.

Victoria was lightened by removing , including  of coal thrown overboard. The leaks were patched up by creating temporary bulkheads and using timber and Portland cement to block holes. Dreadnought and Edinburgh each had hawsers attached to Victoria so they could pull astern. Sampson was lashed alongside so that she could pull backwards, and Victorias own engines were run astern. This was sufficient to move the ship, and she was refloated on the evening of 4 February. The ship proceeded to the new Hamilton Dock in Malta for repairs, being the first ship to use it. Repairs were completed in time for the summer fleet cruise in May.

Sinking

On 22 June 1893, Victoria was leading the Mediterranean Fleet's annual exercises in the Eastern Mediterranean. Admiral Tryon ordered a manoeuvre that was to see each ship turn, one after the other in formation, to steam in the opposite direction. However, with the ships just 1,200 yards apart, and an estimated minimum turning circle of at least 1,600 yards, Victoria, the first ship to turn, was struck by the armoured ram of Camperdown as it turned, causing massive damage to the flagship. Victoria eventually sank in approximately 15 minutes, with 358 members of the crew, including Admiral Tryon, lost.

Wreck site
She stands vertically with her bow and some 30 metres of her length buried in the mud and her stern pointing directly upwards towards the surface. This position is not unique among shipwrecks as first thought, as the Russian monitor  also rests like this. The unusual attitude of this wreck is thought to have been due to the heavy single turret forward containing the main armament coupled with the still-turning propellers driving the wreck downwards.

References

Bibliography 

 
 
Andrew Gordon, The Rules of the Game: Jutland and British Naval Command, John Murray.
David Brown, Warrior to Dreadnought: Warship development 1860–1905, Chatham Publishing.

Richard Hough, Admirals in Collision, Hamish Hamilton, London. Copyright 1959.
Oscar Parkes British Battleships, .
Louis Decimus Rubin, The Summer the Archduke Died: Essays on Wars and Warriors, University of Missouri Press, [2008], 
Rear-Admiral C. C. Penrose Fitzgerald, Life of Vice-Admiral Sir George Tryon K.C.B., William Blackwood and sons, Edinburgh and London, 1897
The Times, The Loss of HMS Victoria, 2 November 1893, page 4, issue 34098, column A. (Admiralty minutes describing the sinking)
Minutes of Proceedings at a Court-Martial held on board her Majesty's ship Hibernia at Malta, on Monday, the seventeenth day of July 1893; and by adjournment, every day thereafter (Sunday excepted) to the Twenty-seventh day of July 1893, to enquire into the loss of her Majesty's ship Victoria , Her Majesty's Stationery Office, printed by Darling & son Ltd, 1893.

External links
Victoria memorial in Portsmouth
Lebanon Daily Star article on the discovery of the wreck
HMS Victoria on the wrecksite, including video and position
Poem by William McGonagall commemorating the loss of the Victoria
Roll of Honour

 

Ships built on the River Tyne
Ships built by Armstrong Whitworth
Victoria-class battleships
Victorian-era battleships of the United Kingdom
Shipwrecks in the Mediterranean Sea
Maritime incidents in 1893
1887 ships
Ships sunk in collisions
Victoria